20 Greatest Hits is the third compilation album of greatest hits by Simon & Garfunkel, released in Australia and Asia in August 1991.

Track listing

"The Sound of Silence" 		
"Homeward Bound" 	
"I Am a Rock" 		
"America"
"59th Street Bridge Song (Feelin' Groovy)" 		
"Cloudy"
"At the Zoo" 		
"El Condor Pasa (If I Could)" 		
"A Hazy Shade of Winter"
"We Got a Groovy Thing Going"
"Cecilia"		
"Keep the Customer Satisfied"
"Mrs Robinson"				
"The Boxer" 		
"Scarborough Fair/Canticle" 		
"The Dangling Conversation"
"Old Friends" 		
"For Emily, Whenever I May Find Her"
"Bridge over Troubled Water" 		
"Song For The Asking"

Personnel

Paul Simon – Vocals, Guitar
Art Garfunkel – Vocals

Charts

Weekly charts

Year-end charts

Certifications

References

External links

1991 greatest hits albums
Simon & Garfunkel compilation albums
Albums produced by Roy Halee
Albums produced by Tom Wilson (record producer)
Albums produced by Bob Johnston
Albums produced by Paul Simon
Sony Records compilation albums
Albums produced by Art Garfunkel